Christopher Robinson,  (21 January 1828 – 31 October 1905) was a Canadian lawyer and prosecutor known for representing the Government of Canada in a number of high-profile cases and international disputes, including the trial of Métis rebel, Louis Riel. Upon graduation from Upper Canada College, he obtained a BA from Trinity College and an MA from the same institution and was called to the bar in 1850. He was appointed a QC in 1863. He twice represented the crown prosecution when Patrick J. Whelan appealed his conviction for the murder of D'Arcy McGee and was the prosecuting attorney that prevailed in the trial of Louis Riel. In his later career, he represented crown interests in the Bering Sea Arbitration of 1893 and was selected by Prime Minister Wilfrid Laurier to represent the Canadian position in a dispute with the United States regarding the boundaries of Alaska. Robinson declined a knighthood in 1894. He died in Toronto, Ontario on 31 October 1905.

References
 

Lawyers in Ontario
Canadian King's Counsel
Upper Canada College alumni
1828 births
1905 deaths